
Gmina Uchanie is a rural gmina (administrative district) in Hrubieszów County, Lublin Voivodeship, in eastern Poland.

The gmina contains part of the protected area called Strzelce Landscape Park.

Villages
Gmina Uchanie contains the villages and settlements of Aurelin, Białowody, Bokinia, Chyżowice, Dębina, Drohiczany, Feliksów, Gliniska, Jarosławiec, Lemieszów, Łuszczów, Łuszczów-Kolonia, Marysin, Miedniki, Mojsławice, Mojsławice-Kolonia, Odletajka, Pielaki, Putnowice Górne, Rozkoszówka, Staszic, Teratyn, Teratyn-Kolonia, Uchanie-Kolonia, Wola Uchańska and Wysokie.

Neighbouring gminas
Gmina Uchanie is bordered by the gminas of Białopole, Grabowiec, Hrubieszów, Trzeszczany and Wojsławice.

References

Polish official population figures 2006

Uchanie
Hrubieszów County